SMS Westfalen was one of the s, the first four dreadnoughts built for the German Imperial Navy. Westfalen was laid down at AG Weser in Bremen on 12 August 1907, launched nearly a year later on 1 July 1908, and commissioned into the High Seas Fleet on 16 November 1909. The ship was equipped with a main battery of twelve  guns in six twin turrets in an unusual hexagonal arrangement.

The ship served with her sister ships for the majority of World War I, seeing extensive service in the North Sea, where she took part in several fleet sorties. These culminated in the Battle of Jutland on 31 May – 1 June 1916, where Westfalen was heavily engaged in night-fighting against British light forces. Westfalen led the German line for much of the evening and into the following day, until the fleet reached Wilhelmshaven. On another fleet advance in August 1916, the ship was damaged by a torpedo from a British submarine.

Westfalen also conducted several deployments to the Baltic Sea against the Russian Navy. The first of these was during the Battle of the Gulf of Riga, where Westfalen supported a German naval assault on the gulf. Westfalen was sent back to the Baltic in 1918 to support the White Finns in the Finnish Civil War. The ship remained in Germany while the majority of the fleet was interned in Scapa Flow after the end of the war. In 1919, following the scuttling of the German fleet in Scapa Flow, Westfalen was ceded to the Allies as a replacement for the ships that had been sunk. She was then sent to ship-breakers in England, who broke the ship up for scrap by 1924.

Description 

German designers initially considered ships equipped with  secondary guns, but erroneous reports in early 1904 that the British s would be equipped with a secondary battery of  guns prompted them to consider an even more powerful ship armed with an all-big-gun armament consisting of eight  guns. Over the next two years, the design was refined into a larger vessel with twelve of the guns, by which time Britain had launched the all-big-gun battleship .

She displaced  with a standard load, and  fully laden. The ship design retained 3-shaft triple expansion engines instead of the more advanced turbine engines. Steam was provided to the engines by twelve coal-fired water-tube boilers, with the addition in 1915 of supplementary oil firing. This machinery was chosen at the request of Admiral Alfred von Tirpitz and the Navy's construction department. The department stated in 1905 that the "use of turbines in heavy warships does not recommend itself." This decision was based solely on cost: at the time, Parsons held a monopoly on steam turbines and required a 1 million gold mark royalty fee for every turbine engine. German firms were not ready to begin production of turbines on a large scale until 1910.

Westfalen carried a main battery of twelve  SK L/45 guns in an unusual hexagonal configuration. Her secondary armament consisted of twelve  SK L/45 guns and sixteen  SK L/45 guns, all of which were mounted in casemates. The ship was also armed with six  submerged torpedo tubes. One tube was mounted in the bow, another in the stern, and two on each broadside, on either end of the torpedo bulkhead.

Service history 

The Reichstag secretly approved and provided funds for Nassau and Westfalen at the end of March 1906, but construction on Westfalen was delayed while arms and armor were procured. She was laid down on 12 August 1907 at the AG Weser shipyard in Bremen. As with her sister , construction proceeded swiftly and secretly; detachments of soldiers guarded both the shipyard and the major contractors who supplied building materials, such as Krupp. The ship was launched on 1 July 1908, underwent an initial fitting-out, and then in mid-September 1909 was transferred to Kiel by a crew composed of dockyard workers for a final fitting-out. However, the water level in the Weser River was low at this time of year, so six pontoons had to be attached to the ship to reduce her draft. Even so, it took two attempts before the ship cleared the river.

On 16 October 1909, before Westfalen was commissioned into the fleet, the ship took part in a ceremony for the opening of the third set of locks in the Kaiser Wilhelm Canal in Kiel. Exactly one month later, Westfalen was commissioned for sea trials, which were interrupted only by fleet training exercises in February 1910. At the completion of the trials on 3 May, Westfalen was added to I Battle Squadron of the High Seas Fleet; two days later, she became the squadron flagship, replacing the pre-dreadnought battleship . The navy had intended to transfer the ship to II Battle Squadron, but this plan was discarded after the outbreak of World War I in July 1914.

World War I 
Westfalen participated in most of the fleet advances into the North Sea throughout the war. The first operation was conducted primarily by Rear Admiral Franz von Hipper's battlecruisers; the ships bombarded the English coastal towns of Scarborough, Hartlepool, and Whitby on 15–16 December 1914. A German battlefleet of 12 dreadnoughts, including Westfalen, her three sisters and eight pre-dreadnoughts sailed in support of the battlecruisers. On the evening of 15 December, they came to within  of an isolated squadron of six British battleships. However, skirmishes between the rival destroyer screens in the darkness convinced the German fleet commander, Admiral Friedrich von Ingenohl, that the entire Grand Fleet was deployed before him. Under orders from Kaiser Wilhelm II, von Ingenohl broke off the engagement and turned the battlefleet back towards Germany. In late March 1915 the ship went into drydock for periodic maintenance.

Battle of the Gulf of Riga 

In August 1915, the German fleet attempted to clear the Russian-held Gulf of Riga in order to assist the German army, which was planning an assault on Riga itself. To do so, the German planners intended to drive off or destroy the Russian naval forces in the Gulf, which included the pre-dreadnought battleship  and a number of smaller gunboats and destroyers. The German battle fleet was accompanied by several mine-warfare vessels, tasked first with clearing Russian minefields and then laying a series of their own minefields in the northern entrance to the Gulf to prevent Russian naval reinforcements from reaching the area. The force operated under the command of Franz von Hipper, who had by now been promoted to vice admiral. The eight battleships were to provide cover for the forces engaging the Russian flotilla. The first attempt on 8 August was broken off, as it took too long to clear the Russian minefields.

On the first day of the assault, two German light craft—the minesweeper  and the destroyer —were sunk. The following day, Nassau and Posen battled Slava, scoring three hits on the Russian ship that forced her to retreat. By 19 August, the Russian minefields had been cleared and the flotilla entered the Gulf. However, reports of Allied submarines in the area prompted the Germans to call off the operation the following day. Admiral Hipper later remarked that "to keep valuable ships for a considerable time in a limited area in which enemy submarines were increasingly active, with the corresponding risk of damage and loss, was to indulge in a gamble out of all proportion to the advantage to be derived from the occupation of the Gulf before the capture of Riga from the land side." In fact, the battlecruiser Moltke had been torpedoed that morning.

Return to the North Sea 
By the end of August Westfalen and the rest of the High Seas Fleet had returned to their anchorages in the North Sea. The next operation conducted was a sweep into the North Sea on 11–12 September, though it ended without any action. Another sortie followed on 23–24 October during which the German fleet did not encounter any British forces. Another uneventful advance into the North Sea took place on 21–22 April 1916. A bombardment mission followed two days later; Westfalen joined the battleship support for Hipper's battlecruisers while they attacked Yarmouth and Lowestoft on 24–25 April. During this operation, the battlecruiser Seydlitz was damaged by a British mine and had to return to port prematurely. Due to poor visibility, the operation was soon called off, leaving the British fleet no time to intercept the raiders.

Battle of Jutland 

Admiral Reinhard Scheer, who had succeeded Admirals von Ingenohl and Hugo von Pohl as the fleet commander, immediately planned another attack on the British coast. However, the damage to Seydlitz and condenser trouble on several of the III Battle Squadron dreadnoughts delayed the plan until the end of May 1916. The German battlefleet departed the Jade at 03:30 on 31 May. Westfalen was assigned to II Division of I Battle Squadron, under the command of Rear Admiral W. Engelhardt. Westfalen was the last ship in the division, astern of her three sisters. II Division was the last unit of dreadnoughts in the fleet; they were followed by only the elderly pre-dreadnoughts of II Battle Squadron.

Between 17:48 and 17:52, eleven German dreadnoughts, including Westfalen, engaged and opened fire on the British 2nd Light Cruiser Squadron, though the range and poor visibility prevented effective fire, which was soon checked. Scheer had by this time called for maximum speed in order to pursue the British ships; Westfalen made . By 19:30 when Scheer signaled "Go west", the German fleet had faced the deployed Grand Fleet for a second time and was forced to turn away. In doing so, the order of the German line was reversed; this would have put II Squadron in the lead, but Captain Redlich of Westfalen noted that II Squadron was out of position and began his turn immediately, assuming the lead position.

Around 21:20, Westfalen and her sister ships began to be engaged by the battlecruisers of the 3rd Battlecruiser Squadron; several large shells straddled (fell to either side of) the ship and rained splinters on her deck. Shortly thereafter, two torpedo tracks were spotted that turned out to be imaginary. The ships were then forced to slow down in order to allow the battlecruisers of I Scouting Group to pass ahead. Around 22:00, Westfalen and Rheinland observed unidentified light forces in the gathering darkness. After flashing a challenge via searchlight that was ignored, the two ships turned away to starboard in order to evade any torpedoes that might have been fired. The rest of I Battle Squadron followed them. During the brief encounter, Westfalen fired seven of her 28 cm shells in the span of about two and a half minutes.  Westfalen again assumed a position guiding the fleet, this time because Scheer wanted lead ships with greater protection against torpedoes than the pre-dreadnoughts had.

At about 00:30, the leading units of the German line encountered British destroyers and cruisers. A violent firefight at close range ensued; Westfalen opened fire on the destroyer  with her 15 cm and 8.8 cm guns at a distance of about 1,800 m (2,000 yd). Her first salvo destroyed Tipperarys bridge and forward deck gun. In the span of five minutes, Westfalen fired ninety-two 15 cm and forty-five 8.8 cm rounds at Tipperary before turning 90 degrees to starboard to evade any torpedoes that might have been fired. Nassau and several cruisers and destroyers joined in the attack on Tipperary; the ship was quickly turned into a burning wreck. The destroyer nevertheless continued to fire with her stern guns and launched her two starboard torpedoes. One of the British destroyers scored a hit on Westfalens bridge with its  guns, killing two men and wounding eight; Captain Redlich was slightly wounded.  At 00:50, Westfalen spotted  and briefly engaged her with her secondary guns; in about 45 seconds she fired thirteen 15 cm and thirteen 8.8 cm shells before turning away. Broke was engaged by other German warships, including the cruiser ; she was hit at least seven times and suffered 42 dead, six missing, and 34 wounded crew members. An officer aboard the light cruiser Southampton described Broke as "an absolute shambles." Despite the serious damage inflicted, Broke managed to withdraw from the battle and reach port. Just after 01:00, Westfalens searchlights fell on the destroyer Fortune, which was wrecked and set ablaze in a matter of seconds by Westfalen and Rheinland. She also managed to sink the British destroyer .

Despite the ferocity of the night fighting, the High Seas Fleet punched through the British destroyer forces and reached Horns Reef by 4:00 on 1 June.  With Westfalen in the lead, the German fleet reached Wilhelmshaven a few hours later, where the battleship and two of her sisters took up defensive positions in the outer roadstead. Over the course of the battle, the ship had fired fifty-one 28 cm shells, one-hundred and seventy-six 15 cm rounds, and one hundred and six 8.8 cm shells. Repair work followed immediately in Wilhelmshaven and was completed by 17 June.

Raid of 18–19 August 

Another fleet advance followed on 18–22 August, during which the I Scouting Group battlecruisers were to bombard the coastal town of Sunderland in an attempt to draw out and destroy Beatty's battlecruisers. The High Seas Fleet, including Westfalen at the rear of the line, would trail behind and provide cover. Three torpedo-boats were detached from the fleet to escort the damaged ship back to port; Westfalen made  on the return trip. The British were aware of the German plans and sortied the Grand Fleet to meet them. By 14:35, Admiral Scheer had been warned of the Grand Fleet's approach and, unwilling to engage the whole of the Grand Fleet just 11 weeks after the close call at Jutland, turned his forces around and retreated to German ports. Repairs to Westfalen lasted until 26 September.

Following the repair work, Westfalen briefly went into the Baltic Sea for training, before returning to the North Sea on 4 October. The fleet then advanced as far as the Dogger Bank on 19–20 October. The ship remained in port for the majority of 1917. The ship did not actively take part in Operation Albion in the Baltic, though she was stationed off Apenrade to prevent a possible British incursion into the area.

Expedition to Finland 

On 22 February 1918, Westfalen and Rheinland were tasked with a mission to Finland to support German army units to be deployed there. The Finns were engaged in a Civil War between the Whites and the Reds. On 23 February, the two ships took on the 14th Jäger Battalion, and early on 24 February they departed for Åland. Åland was to be a forward operating base, from which the port of Hanko would be secured, following an assault on the capital of Helsinki. Negotiations ensued, which resulted in the landing of the German troops on Åland on 7 March; Westfalen then returned to Danzig.

Westfalen remained in Danzig until 31 March, when she departed for Finland with Posen; the ships arrived at Russarö, which was the outer defense for Hanko, by 3 April. The German army quickly took the port. The task force then proceeded to Helsingfors; on 9 April Westfalen stood off Reval, organizing the invasion force. Two days later the ship passed into the harbor at Helsingfors and landed the soldiers; she supported their advance with her main guns. The Red Guards were defeated within three days. The ship remained in Helsingfors until 30 April, by which time the White government had been installed firmly in power.

Following the operation, Westfalen returned to the North Sea where she rejoined I Battle Squadron. On 11 August, Westfalen, Posen, and  steamed out towards Terschelling to support German patrols in the area. After returning to port, she was decommissioned and employed as an artillery training ship.

Fate 
Following the German collapse in November 1918, a significant portion of the High Seas Fleet was interned in Scapa Flow under the terms of the Armistice. Westfalen and her three sisters—the oldest dreadnoughts in the German navy-were not among the ships listed for internment, so they remained in German ports. During the internment, a copy of The Times informed the German commander, Rear Admiral Ludwig von Reuter, that the Armistice was to expire at noon on 21 June 1919, the deadline by which Germany was to have signed the peace treaty. Von Reuter believed that the British intended to seize the German ships after the Armistice expired. To prevent this, he decided to scuttle his ships at the first opportunity. On the morning of 21 June, the British fleet left Scapa Flow to conduct training maneuvers; at 11:20 Reuter transmitted the order to his ships.

As a result of the scuttling at Scapa Flow, the Allies demanded replacements for the ships that had been sunk. Westfalen was struck from the German naval list on 5 November 1919 and subsequently handed over to the Allies under the contract name "D" on 5 August 1920. The ship was then sold to ship-breakers in Birkenhead, where she was broken up for scrap by 1924.

Notes

Footnotes

Citations

References

Further reading
 

Nassau-class battleships
Ships built in Bremen (state)
1908 ships
World War I battleships of Germany